Pleurodema tucumanum is a species of frog in the family Leptodactylidae.
It is endemic to Argentina.
Its natural habitats are temperate shrubland, subtropical or tropical dry shrubland, intermittent freshwater marshes, arable land, pastureland, seasonally flooded agricultural land, and canals and ditches.

References

Pleurodema
Amphibians of Argentina
Endemic fauna of Argentina
Taxonomy articles created by Polbot
Amphibians described in 1927